Te Wairoa is a group of Ngāti Kahungunu and Ngāti Rongomaiwahine Māori hapū of New Zealand who have joined together for Treaty of Waitangi settlement negotiations.

See also
List of Māori iwi

References

 
Iwi and hapū